RTM Okey (stylised as OKeY) is a Malaysian free-to-air television channel operated by Radio Televisyen Malaysia dedicated to East Malaysians and urban youths. It was launched on 21 March 2018 and airs programmes in English, Malay, and East Malaysian languages such as Bajau, Dusun, Kadazan (Sabah) and Iban (Sarawak).

The channel's name is an acronym for “opportunity”, “knowledge”, “experience” and “yours”.

History

Before TV Okey existed, three test channels were launched by RTM as part of its Digital terrestrial television (DTT) broadcasting trial on selected households and pay television network Astro channel 180 from 2006 to 2018: RTMi, RTM Muzik Aktif (Active Music) and TVi (TV Interaktif/TV Interactive). RTMi was a channel that broadcast RTM1 and RTM2 programme previews for 5 hours daily from 7:00 p.m. until 12:00 a.m., RTM Muzik Aktif was a music channel while TVi was a channel that promoted East Malaysian culture. There were plans in the early 2010s to launch state television channels for Sabah and Sarawak by RTM, but eventually they were not realised. In Sarawak, however, the state television plan was later undertaken by Sarawak Media Group, which launched TVS on 11 October 2020.

TV Okey was launched on 21 March 2018 in the evening at Hilton Hotel in Kota Kinabalu, Sabah. On 1 April 2019, TV Okey has started its HDTV broadcasting in conjunction with RTM's 73rd anniversary, and available exclusively through myFreeview DTT service on Channel 110. Beginning 6 April 2020, TV Pendidikan air on the channel daily under the Kelas@Rumah (Class@Home) programming, marking its return to RTM after 20 years.

See also
 TV1
 TV2
 Sukan RTM
 Berita RTM
 Television in Malaysia
 Radio Televisyen Malaysia

References

External links
 
 
 

Television channels and stations established in 2018
2018 establishments in Malaysia
Television stations in Malaysia
Radio Televisyen Malaysia